Joe Carter is a former CNN and HLN Sports reporter and News Anchor and founder of Hencar production company.

Life and career
Carter was born in Arvada, Colorado. He was educated at Pomona High School, a public high school where he played football and baseball. After graduation, he enrolled at Colorado State University. Carter worked at the Campus Television Station, where he hosted the locally popular sports show called CTV SportsFest. Carter and the CTV SportsFest team were honored with the Heartland Emmy Awards for best student informational program, and was recognized by the Associated Press with a first-place award for sports feature and sports reporting.

Carter took his first professional on-air TV job in 2002 at the CBS affiliate WHBF-TV in Rock Island, Illinois as the weekend sports anchor. He then moved to WHNS-TV  in Greenville, South Carolina as the station’s sports director.

Starting in 2007 Carter worked as a morning show reporter for WTVJ-TV in Miami, Florida with a segment that reports on websites that viewers send in via e-mail.

Carter was hired by HLN (TV network) in 2009, to work as a sports anchor for the weekend news alongside Robin Meade. Carter then began working for CNN and CNN International under the Bleacher Report segment, covering events such as the Super Bowl, the Kentucky Derby, and the Daytona 500, as well as Hard News stories for CNN.

In 2015, Carter created Hencar, a video production company which focuses on creating marketing and advertising content.

Personal life
Carter met his wife Susan Hendricks when they worked together at HLN. They married in 2016 and reside in Atlanta, along with their son Jackson and Susan’s daughter Emery, from a previous marriage.

References 

Year of birth missing (living people)
Living people
American television sports announcers
American television reporters and correspondents